Tangará da Serra is a municipality in the state of Mato Grosso in the Central-West Region of Brazil. 

The Sepotuba River, known for its many waterfalls and rapids, is located near Tangará da Serra.

The city is served by Tangará da Serra Airport.

See also
List of municipalities in Mato Grosso
Serra do Tapirapuã
Nova Olímpia
Tapirapuã

References

Municipalities in Mato Grosso